William Wei is the self-titled debut studio album by Taiwanese Mandopop singer-songwriter William Wei. It was released on 4 June 2010, by Linfair Records. The album consists of 10 tracks, of which 2 are newly arranged. A 'Night Edition' of the album was released by Linfair Records on 17 August 2010, and was limited to 5,000 copies worldwide.

The album received 4 nominations at the 22nd Golden Melody Awards, including 1 win. It was nominated for Best Mandarin Album, and 'Have or Have Not' (有沒有) earned Wei a nomination for Best Composer. Wei was also nominated for Best Mandarin Male Singer and eventually won Best New Artist.

Track listing

Music videos

References

2010 albums
William Wei albums